Tottey is a surname. Notable people with the surname include:

Bill Tottey (1888–1943), Australian rules footballer
Fred Tottey (1909–1977), Australian rugby league player

See also
Ottey